The women's rhythmic individual ribbon gymnastics competition at the 2018 Commonwealth Games in Gold Coast, Australia was held on 13 April at the Coomera Indoor Sports Centre. Gold Medalist Amy Kwan Dict Weng originally scored 12.900 points, but after an appeal on the judge's score by her team manager, her score was rectified to 13.200 points.

Final
Results:

References

Gymnastics at the 2018 Commonwealth Games
2018 in women's gymnastics